Allround may refer to:

Dual-sport motorcycle
All-around event in gymnastics
World Allround Speed Skating Championships
All round defence

See also
All-rounder